Hibiscadelphus bombycinus, the Kawaihae hibiscadelphus, was a species of flowering plant in the family Malvaceae. It was found only in Hawaii. It has not been collected since 1868.  It is presumed extinct since 1920.

References

bombycinus
Extinct flora of Hawaii
Endemic flora of Hawaii
Plant extinctions since 1500
Taxonomy articles created by Polbot